Bekovsky District is an administrative and municipal district (raion), one of the twenty-seven in Penza Oblast, Russia. It is located in the southwest of the oblast. Its administrative center is the urban locality (a work settlement) of Bekovo. As of the 2010 Census, the total population of the district was 17,531, with the population of Bekovo accounting for 39.6% of that number.

History
The district was established in 1928.

References

Notes

Sources

Districts of Penza Oblast
States and territories established in 1928
